NATIONAL SECURITY ACTION MEMORANDUM NO. 235 was an NSAM signed by President Kennedy at Washington D.C. on April 17, 1963 which placed requirements on Federal agencies and required Presidential approval prior to conducting Large-Scale Scientific or Technological Experiments with Possible Adverse Environmental Effects.  It was sent to 

and stated:

NSAM 235 was declassified on September 22, 1993.

See also
Partial Nuclear Test Ban Treaty
NASA

References

Kennedy Library, National Security Files, Departments and Agencies Series, Space Activities, General, 1/63-5/63, Box 307.
Confidential. Declassified.

United States national security directives
United States national security policy